Embolostoma is a genus of moths belonging to the subfamily Olethreutinae of the family Tortricidae.

Species
Embolostoma plutostola Diakonoff, 1977

See also
List of Tortricidae genera

References

External links
Tortricid.net

Tortricidae genera
Olethreutinae
Taxa named by Alexey Diakonoff